The Helsinki Strings is a string youth orchestra in Helsinki, Finland.

The orchestra was founded in 1972 by Géza and Csaba Szilvay, who conducted it until their retirement in 2010. The present conductor is Jukka Rantamäki.

See also 
 List of youth orchestras

References

External links
 Helsingin Juniorijouset – The Helsinki Strings TAMZARA on YouTube

1972 establishments in Finland
Musical groups established in 1972
Youth orchestras
Finnish orchestras
Organisations based in Helsinki
Music in Helsinki